William Twisse (1578 near Newbury, England – 20 July 1646) was a prominent English clergyman and theologian. He was named Prolocutor of the Westminster Assembly in an Ordinance dated 12 June 1643, putting him at the head of the churchmen of the Commonwealth. He was described by a Scottish member, Robert Baillie, as "very good, beloved of all, and highlie esteemed; but merelie bookish".

Life
Twisse's parents were German. He was educated at Winchester College and New College, Oxford.

He was appointed chaplain to Elizabeth of Bohemia, by her father James I of England, in 1612. This position was short-lived, and he returned to England from Heidelberg around 1613.

He was then given a living at Newton Longueville. He was involved with Henry Savile in the 1618 edition of the works of Thomas Bradwardine. He was vicar of Newbury from 1620. There he was known as an opponent of William Laud.

He died on 20 July 1646 and was buried in Westminster Abbey, but exhumed in 1661 and his remains deposited with those of dozens of other Parliamentarians in a pit in the churchyard of St Margaret's, Westminster.

Views
Twisse was a strong defender of a Calvinist, supralapsarian position. In his Vindiciae gratiae of 1632 he attacked Jacobus Arminius, and in Dissertatio de scientia media of 1639 adopted certain Dominican arguments, on predestination. His views were in a minority at the Westminster Assembly.

A premillennialist, he wrote a preface to the 1643 English translation, Key of the Revelation, of Joseph Mede's influential Clavis Apocalyptica. Mede was a friend and correspondent.

Works
 A Discovery of D. Jackson's Vanity (1631) against Thomas Jackson
 Vindiciae Gratiae (Amsterdam, 1632)
 Dissertatio de scientia media tribus libris absoluta (Arnhem 1639)
 The Riches of Gods Love (1653), with Henry Jeanes and John Goodwin
An Examination of Mr. Cotton's Analysis of The Ninth Chapter of Romans
The Five Points of Grace and of Predestination
Of the Morality of the Fourth Commandment
A Treatise of Mr. Cotton's Clearing Certaine Doubts Concerning Predestination
The Doctrine of the Synod of Dort and Arles, Reduced to the Practice (1650)
Of the morality of the Fourth Commandment, as still in force to binde Christians : delivered by way of answer to the translator of Doctor Prideaux his lecture, concerning the doctrine of the Sabbath (1641) 
https://archive.org/details/ofmoralityoffour00twis

References

Further reading
Sarah Hutton, Thomas Jackson, Oxford Platonist, and William Twisse, Aristotelian, Journal of the History of Ideas, Vol. 39, No. 4 (Oct.-Dec., 1978)

External links

1578 births
1646 deaths
People educated at Winchester College
Westminster Divines
16th-century English writers
16th-century male writers
Alumni of New College, Oxford
English Calvinist and Reformed theologians
Supralapsarians
17th-century Calvinist and Reformed theologians
17th-century English Anglican priests